Rex I. Gary was an American football, basketball, and baseball coach. He was the head football coach at Wheaton College in Wheaton, Illinois, serving for two seasons, from 1919 to 1920, and compiling a record of 5–6–1.

References

Year of birth missing
Year of death missing
Wheaton Thunder baseball coaches
Wheaton Thunder football coaches
Wheaton Thunder men's basketball coaches